Shokhiyaan is a Pakistani sitcom series produced under banner of Production Headquarters. It features Mehmood Aslam, Hina Dilpazeer, Ahmed Hassan and Anam Tanveer in pivotal roles.

The show marked second on-screen appearance of both Mehmood and Hina together in a comedy series, after their hit show Bulbulay, also directed by Rana Rizwan. It was premiered on 25 May 2020, second day of the Eid-ul-fitr festivities.

Cast

Main Cast
Hina Dilpazeer as Gori
Mehmood Aslam as Sikander
Ahmed Hassan as Fahad
Anam Tanveer as Shireen

Recurring Cast
Shahid Khwaja (Ep;01)
Irfan Motiwala (Ep:; 01,26)
Ismail Tara (Ep;03)
Tabbasum Arif as Beena (Ep;05)
Saqib Sumeer
Nasir Shareef
Saleem Mairaj
Fahmeed Baig
Sonia Rao
Aamir Qureshi
Wasla
Akbar Khan
Namrah Shahid
Uzair Abbasi
M.Saleem
Ayaz
Mehboob Sultan
Arif Siddiqui
Fareena Ejaz
Hashim Butt
Shahid Naqvi
Nasir Shareef
Agha Sheeraz
Kausar Siddiqui
Sharique Mehmood
Shahida Murtaza (Ep;23) as Tehmina aka Timmy Aunty; a fraud woman pretending to be an elite new shifted neighbour in the vicinity of Gori and Sikander's house.
Muhammad Hanif (Ep;25)

References

2020 Pakistani television series debuts
Urdu-language television shows
Pakistani drama television series
Geo TV original programming